Munpalli is a village and mandal in Sangareddy district of Telangana, India.

The villages in Munpalli mandal includes Antharam, Belur, Bhusareddipalle, Bodishetpalle, Bodpalle, Budhera, Chilepalle, Chinna Loni, Chinna Chelmeda, Garlapalle, Kamkole, Khammampalle, Lingampalle, Lonikalan, Lonikurdu, Makthakesaram, Mallikarjunpally, Mansanpalle, elasangam, Moqdumpalle, Munpalli, Pedda Chelmeda, Pedda Gopalaram, Pedda Loni, Polkampalle, Tatipalle, Thakkadpalle, Mallareddypeta, Allapur, Takkadapally, Hydlapur, and Ibrahimpur.

References

Sangareddy district